Kosovo–Sweden relations are foreign relations between the Republic of Kosovo and the Kingdom of Sweden. Kosovo declared its independence from Serbia on 17 February 2008 and Sweden recognised it on 4 March 2008. Kosovo opened an embassy in Stockholm on 15 December 2009. The Swedish Liaison Office in Pristina, which was later upgraded to embassy status, represents Sweden's interests in the Republic of Kosovo. On 8 March 2008, the Swedish Minister for Foreign Affairs Carl Bildt became the first foreign minister to officially visit Kosovo since it declared its independence. The two countries enjoy very good and friendly relations.

Military
Sweden currently has 243 troops serving in Kosovo as peacekeepers in the NATO led Kosovo Force.

See also 
 Foreign relations of Kosovo
 Foreign relations of Sweden
 Serbia–Sweden relations
 Sweden–Yugoslavia relations

Notes and references
Notes:

References:

 
Sweden
Bilateral relations of Sweden